"Ghost of You and Me" is a 2001 single by British pop band BBMak. It appears on BBMak's debut studio album, Sooner or Later. The song peaked at number 8 on the US Adult Contemporary chart. It was written by Jon Lind and Richard Page (former vocalist of Mr. Mister). The song was covered in Australia by Rick Price for his album Another Place.

Background 
"Ghost of You and Me" was originally recorded by Curtis Stigers for his 1995 album Time Was. Jon Lind played the demo for BBMak member Mark Barry when the band was recording in Los Angeles. Barry brought the demo to his band mates and they agreed to record it, with Barry saying, "When we recorded it we were so pleased at how it turned out to be. We had a full orchestra on the track,. It sounds big, its a big epic ballad. It's one of those songs you know when you hear it you fall in love with it. So from our reaction as well we were very confident it would be hit".

Music and lyrics 
The song is a ballad and has a tempo of 200 beats per minute. Chuck Taylor of Billboard wrote the song has "a vivid lyric characterizing one's reluctance to give up on a loved one, alongside a bounty of percussive brush strokes, piano, a guitar, and even a weeping cello".

Music video 
The music video was directed by Nigel Dick and shot in Puerto Rico. Mark Barry, Christian Burns, and Stephen McNally sing and play guitar on the beach and walk through the streets. They are each haunted by visions of their respective ex-lovers. Later, the men sing on an outdoor stage, flanked by violin players. The women in the visions multiply into many more "ghosts", and a final aerial shot shows the group of women walking on the island, wearing white and carrying candles. The video became a mainstay on the MTV show TRL.

Credits and personnel 
Credits are adapted from the UK CD1 liner notes.

Locations
 Recorded at Hollywood Studios (Hollywood, California)
 Mixed at Royaltone Studios (California)

BBMak
 Christian Burns – writing
 Mark Barry – writing
 Stephen McNally – writing

Other personnel
 Jon Lind – writing
 Richard Page - writing
 Rob Cavallo - production
 Allen Sides – recording
 Chris Lord-Alge – mixing

Charts

Weekly charts

Year-end charts

References

External links
Lyrics on Lyrics.com

1995 songs
2001 singles
Curtis Stigers songs
BBMak songs
Pop ballads
Songs written by Jon Lind
Songs written by Richard Page (musician)
Song recordings produced by Rob Cavallo